Mister T is an American animated series that aired on NBC on Saturday morning from 1983 to 1985, featuring the popular actor Mr. T. A total of 30 episodes were produced during all three seasons, with the thirteen episodes for Season 1, eleven for Season 2, and six episodes for the third and final season. The series was produced by Ruby-Spears Enterprises.

Reruns were later seen on the USA Cartoon Express in the late 1980s and early 1990s, and more recently as part of Cartoon Network's Adult Swim late-night programming block and sibling network, Boomerang that airs classic cartoons from the Hanna-Barbera, pre-1991 Ruby-Spears, Turner and classic Warner animated libraries. This is also Phil LaMarr's first role.

Plot
The cartoon stars Mr. T as a coach to a gymnastics team (with a specific emphasis on members Jeff, Woody, Robin, and Kim), travelling the world while becoming involved in and solving various mysteries similar to the Scooby-Doo franchise.

At the beginning of each episode, a live-action introduction featuring Mr. T himself is shown to explain what the episode is about. At the end of each episode, he narrates a moral lesson for the audience.

Characters
 Mr. T (voiced by himself) – He is the coach of the gymnastics team, and also appears to be a licensed bus driver as he drives the team's bus when Ms. Bisby is either unavailable or has run out of driving hours.
 Ms. Priscilla Bisby (voiced by Takayo Fischer) – The team's well-mannered bus driver who loves mystery novels and is a mother figure to the kids. Her catchphrase is "My stars and garters!" She also knows how to steer a boat and pilot a helicopter.
 Jeff Harris (voiced by Shawn Lieber) – The wise guy of the team with a big ego.
 Woody Daniels (voiced by Phil LaMarr) – An African-American gymnast and Jeff's friendly rival. He hopes to become a lawyer when he retires from gymnastics.
 Robin O'Neill (voiced by Amy Linker) – A beautiful, green-eyed redhead with freckles who's eager to jump into any situation. She also acts as Mr. T's second-in-command. She bears a strong resemblance to her late older sister Cathy (see "Secret of the Spectral Sister"). Her catchphrase is "What the hairy heck?"
 Kim Nakamura (voiced by Siu Ming Carson) – A Japanese American girl who is the daughter of a computer scientist. She has a photographic memory that comes in handy as she can remember various magazine articles and book passages — including the issue or volume, and the page she read it on.
 Spike O'Neill (voiced by Teddy Field III) – Robin's little brother, who worships Mr. T, sometimes talks like him; and dresses in a similar manner to his idol. In "Secret of the Spectral Sister", it's revealed that Spike is just a nickname. However, his actual first name is never revealed.
 Skye Redfern (voiced by Cathy Cavadini) – A Native American gymnast, whose grandfather was accused of a crime.
 Garcia Lopez (voice artist unknown) – A Latin American gymnast whose big brother Miguel is an archaeologist. He is a keen photographer.
 Vince D'Amato (voice artist unknown) – An Italian American who has dreams of being a movie star.
 Courtney Howard (voice artist unknown) – An African-American girl gymnast whose father is a major in the military. Her uncle is a magician who was previously a burglar.
 Grant Kline (voice artist unknown) – An ex-gang member who turned his life around thanks to Jeff.
 Bulldozer – Mr. T's bulldog, who sports a similar mohawk hairstyle to his owner. He is also called Dozer for short. He usually accompanies Spike.
 An un-named blonde girl, who was seen on the bus, but neither spoke nor had her own focus episode. There are also a few other non-speaking girl gymnasts.

Series overview

Episodes

Season 1 (1983)

Season 2 (1984)

Season 3 (1985)

Home media
The first season was released DVD on May 10, 2011, via the Warner Archive Collection. The Mister T DVD set is branded as part of the Hanna-Barbera Classics Collection.

See also
 Mr. T (comics)
 Mr. T Cereal

References

External links
 
 Mister T at the Big Cartoon Database

1983 American television series debuts
1985 American television series endings
1980s American black cartoons
American children's animated action television series
American children's animated mystery television series
American television series with live action and animation
Animation based on real people
NBC original programming
Television series by Ruby-Spears
English-language television shows
Works by Jack Kirby
Cultural depictions of Mr. T
Television series created by Steve Gerber